Micrelephas pseudokadenii is a moth in the family Crambidae. It was described by Bernard Landry in 2000. It is found in Peru.

References

Moths described in 2000
Moths of South America